Mat Mania – The Prowrestling Network, known in Japan as , or simply either as Mat Mania or , is a Japanese pro wrestling-themed arcade video game developed by Technōs Japan and published by Taito in 1985. It is a spiritual successor to the 1983 arcade game Tag-Team Wrestling, also developed by Technōs Japan, but published by Data East. The arcade game was a commercial success in Japan and North America, becoming the highest-grossing arcade conversion kit of 1986 in the United States.

An updated arcade version with a two-player competitive mode was released in 1986 as Mania Challenge. Atari Corporation published an Atari 7800 port in 1990 which includes features of both games and lacks others. Mat Mania was re-released for the PlayStation 4 as part of the Arcade Archives collection in 2015 and the Nintendo Switch in 2019.

Gameplay

The game is presented in the guise of a televised pro-wrestling broadcast, the Taito Wrestling Association (TWA) (Technos Wrestling Association in the Japanese version). The intro sequence and subsequent intermissions portray a disheveled pro-wrestling host, Cory (Nari in the Japanese version). His hair is unkempt and his sleeves rolled up as he manically announces the particulars of the upcoming bout.

The player controls a wrestler who makes his way through the ranks of the TWA, challenging various thematically colorful opponents, before finally challenging the champion in the fifth match. Upon ascending to the championship, the player is presented with a championship belt in a presentation ceremony. The player must then defend his title against the previous five opponents, drawn at random.

Characters

The Player/Dynamite Tommy
The player-controlled wrestler was possibly modeled after The Dynamite Kid. Called simply "You" in Exciting Hour and Mat Mania, he is dubbed Dynamite Tommy (the Dynamite Kid's real name is Tom Billington) in Mania Challenge. However, there are signs held up in the crowd which read Fight Tommy and Tommy great, and since all the challengers have a name, the name Tommy only could refer to the unnamed player's character. He sports shaggy brown hair and wears blue trunks and white boots. His assortment of manoeuvres include: a punch and a high kick, and a shoulder block from a standing position; from a headlock, an Irish whip, a body slam, a piledriver, and a vertical suplex; upon a running opponent, a back body drop, an elbow smash, a clothesline or a jumping back kick; upon a downed opponent, a running body splash, or, from a turnbuckle, a sunset flip or a knee drop. The player-controlled wrestler is fashioned after common "babyface" performers of the era.

Insane Warrior
Misspelt "Insane Worrier" in Exciting Hour. He is fashioned after fanciful, dystopian punk/barbarian themed performers popular during the 80s (most notably Road Warrior Animal). Characteristically, he sports a Mohawk hairstyle, loose-fitting black trousers and heavy make-up. Accordingly, his maneuvers are limited to unskilled clubbing blows and a Gorilla Press body slam as his ultimate move. Also, unique from other opponents in that he pins the player-controlled wrestler using only one hand. He has the Player's Elbow Smash and Clothesline.

Karate Fighter
A martial arts themed wrestler. His silken, Manchu style trousers and slippers indicates something of a misnomer - Kung Fu Fighter seems more appropriate. Typically his maneuvers include fast, kicking strikes, jump kicks, and karate chops (used as a normal grasp and also as his finishing move). His hair is shaggy and covers his face, suggesting possible inspiration by The Great Kabuki, Chopsocky, or well-known martial artists such as Bruce Lee and Bolo Yeung. In the introductory sequence he is depicted with what would appear to be a set of nunchaku, but this weapon is not used during actual game-play. He is the only opponent who does not possess any of the Player's moves. Karate Fighter's character concept was later adapted by Technos for the Chin Taimei character featured in the NES version of Double Dragon.

Coco Savage
Named "Coco Savege" in the game. He is a "Wild Man" themed wrestler, clearly inspired by Bobo Brazil. Depicted wearing a Leopard skin and barefoot, he is unique from other opponents in that his attacking style is especially swift.  He neither punches nor kicks; rather, he is the only opponent to use the shoulder block, the same used by the Player. His unorthodox and unpredictable fighting style includes shoulder blocks, coconuts (punches to the head while in a headlock), a Mongolian chop and giant swing throw as his finishing move, as well as a body splash on a downed opponent. He is quite possibly the most difficult opponent to beat in the game.

The Pirania
A masked "rúdo" themed wrestler fashioned after Mil Mascaras, who often used a mask with a shark teeth design. Pirania uses illegal tactics, like choking, and cheating to win his matches. He possesses the Player's back body drop. He also uses a Clawhold, performed after whipping the Player off the ropes, which drops the Player to his knees almost immediately. Perhaps his most effective, and most humiliating, move involves suspending the Player above the mat by grabbing his hair with one hand, and illegally gouging him square in the eyes with the other. He also uses an elbow drop as his ultimate move.

Golden Hulk
Named "Blues Bloody" in Exciting Hour. The TWA World Champion, who uses his strength and skill to overpower his opponent, clearly inspired by famed All Japan Pro Wrestling star, Bruiser Brody. In some versions of the game, the world champion changed to more closely resemble Hulk Hogan to reflect the rise of Hogan's popularity, although the character's furry boots (a la Brody) remained intact. He was named as Golden Hulk in Mat Mania for the purposes of U.S. licensing, likely to exploit the popular appeal of Hulk Hogan in that market. He uses Hogan's "Legdrop of Doom" as a finisher, which Brody also used. He also has the Player's body slam (performed one-armed - another homage to Brody) and Elbow Smash, plus a dropkick, which the player's character later gained in Mania Challenge.

Cameo appearances 
In the crowd, players are able to see:
 Superman
 Batman & Robin
 ZZ Top
 Popeye
 Alien
 Stevie Wonder
 John Travolta
 The Jackson Five
 The Stay Puft Marshmallow Man from Ghostbusters
 Darth Vader and Princess Leia from Star Wars

Ports 
Atari Corporation released an Atari 7800 version in 1990 as Mat Mania Challenge. The company described it as a cross between Mat Mania and Mania Challenge, as the game includes both Dynamite Tommy and Hurricane Joe from the latter game, but it also omits all of the villain characters. An Atari 8-bit family port was planned but never released. A prototype was sold for a limited time by B&C ComputerVisions.

Reception 
In Japan, Exciting Hour was the highest-grossing table arcade unit of October 1985. In the United States, Mat Mania was the highest-grossing arcade conversion kit of 1986,
and the year's third highest-grossing overall arcade game.

Legacy
Mania Challenge is an updated version of Mat Mania released in 1986, a year after the original. It adds a two-player competitive mode. The first player takes control of the main character from the original game, now named Dynamite Tommy, while the second player controls a new character named Hurricane Joe, who plays identically to Tommy. Mania Challenge also adds several countering techniques to the player's move set from Mat Mania such as countering a headlock with an atomic drop or a suplex, or throwing drop kicks. However, the character roster was reduced to only three opponents in the single player mode: the Insane Warrior, the Golden Hulk and the other player character controlled by the computer (Dynamite Tommy or Hurricane Joe), repeating those three opponents in subsequent loops.

References

External links
 Mat Mania — The Prowrestling Network at Arcade History
 
Mat Mania at Arcade Archives

1985 video games
Arcade video games
Atari 7800 games
Multiplayer and single-player video games
Nintendo Switch games
PlayStation 4 games
PlayStation Network games
Professional wrestling games
X68000 games
Technōs Japan games
Taito arcade games
Video games developed in Japan
Hamster Corporation games